The Mixosauria were an early group of ichthyosaurs, living between 247.2 and 235 million years ago, during the Triassic period. Fossils of mixosaurs have been found all over the world: China, Timor, Indonesia, Italy, Germany, Spitsbergen, Switzerland, Svalbard, Canada, Alaska, and Nevada.

Cladogram based on Motani (1999), Maisch and Matzke (2000), and Jiang, Schmitz, Hao & Sun (2006), with clade and generic names following Maisch (2010):

References

Triassic ichthyosaurs
Triassic reptiles of Asia
Triassic reptiles of Europe
Triassic reptiles of North America
Fossil taxa described in 1999